Voltaire (1826 – 16 April 1848) was a British Thoroughbred racehorse. He won five of his six races, including the Doncaster Gold Cup in 1828. After retiring from racing he became a successful stallion, siring St. Leger winner Charles the Twelfth and Voltigeur, who won both The Derby and the St. Leger. He was bred and owned by Robert Stephenson, before being sold to William Vane, Marquess of Cleveland, whom he raced for as a three-year-old.

Background
Voltaire was a brown colt bred by Robert Stephenson and foaled in 1826. He was sired by Blacklock, who won seventeen races including three Great Subscription Purses. Blacklock was also a successful stallion and was the leading sire in Great Britain and Ireland in 1829. Amongst his other progeny were York St. Leger winner Velocipede and Doncaster Gold Cup winner Laurel. Voltaire was the fifth foal of his dam, an unnamed daughter of Epsom Derby winner Phantom.

Racing career

1828: Two-year-old season
Voltaire made his debut on 9 April 1828 at Catterick Bridge, when he beat four rivals to win the Richmond Club Stakes. His only other start as a two-year-old came in July in the Tyro Stakes at Newcastle, where he faced five opponents. Starting as the 6/4 favourite and ridden by Sim Templeman, he won the race from Zodiac. During the winter he was amongst the favourites for the 1829 St. Leger Stakes.

1829: Three-year-old season
Voltaire's first race as a three-year-old was The Shorts, a Sweepstakes of 50 sovereigns each over one mile at York. He started at the 1/2 favourite and ridden by J. Day, he won the race from Penhill, with Elastic finishing in third place. He was one on nineteen horses to contest the St. Leger Stakes at Doncaster in August. Rowton started the race as the favourite, with Frederick and Voltaire next at 4/1. Ridden by William Scott, Rowton took the lead a long way from the finish. Voltaire closed on the leader, but was still some distance behind as they entered the final furlong. Voltaire steadily closed on Rowton, who was being hard ridden, but could only finish second, a neck behind Rowton. Sir Hercules was third, with Felt finishing in fourth.

Two days later Voltaire walked over for the Gascoigne Stakes, ran over the same course and distance as the St. Leger. Later in the day had his final race in the Doncaster Gold Cup, ran over two miles and five furlongs. Voltaire and the previous year's winner Laurel started the race at similar prices in the betting. Granby led the field at the start, until he was overtaken by Laurel, who was closely followed by Voltaire. The two raced together until Voltaire was asked to quicken by jockey Thomas Lye, when he pulled out a slight lead and won easily by half a length. Laurel finished the race in second place and Fleur de Lis in third. Voltaire was kept in training as a four-year-old, but never raced. This was due to a leg injury he sustained in the Gold Cup.

Stud career

In 1832 Voltaire stood as a stallion at Boroughbridge in Yorkshire for a fee of 10 sovereigns. By 1841 he was standing at an increased fee of 16 guineas.

His most notable progeny were:
 Charles the Twelfth (1836) – won the St. Leger and two Goodwood Cups. He didn't have much success as a sire, but did produce Grand National winner Little Charley.
 Lollypop (1836) – was the dam of Doncaster Cup winner Sweetmeat.
 Vivandiere (1838) – won the Yorkshire Oaks and foaled Cantine, who won the Coronation Stakes and Nassau Stakes.
 Yorkshire Lady (1839) – won the Stewards' Cup.
 Merope (1841) – finished second in both the 1000 Guineas and Oaks in 1844. She was the dam of Flying Duchess who foaled Derby winner and important sire Galopin.
 Prussic Acid (1843) – won the Trial Stakes.
 Voltigeur (1847) – won The Derby, St. Leger and Doncaster Cup in 1850. As a sire he produced 2000 Guineas winner Vedette and two Ascot Gold Cup winners in Buckstone and Skirmisher.

Voltaire died on 16 April 1848 at Hart in County Durham. Voltigeur's son Vedette sired Galopin (Voltaire therefore appearing twice in the third generation of his pedigree), who sired the undefeated St. Simon. It is mainly through St. Simon that Voltaire's sire line survives today.

Pedigree

Note: b. = Bay, br. = Brown, ch. = Chestnut

* Voltaire was inbred 4x4 to King Fergus. This means that the stallion appears twice in the fourth generation of his pedigree.

See also
List of leading Thoroughbred racehorses
List of historical horses

References

1826 racehorse births
1848 racehorse deaths
Racehorses bred in the United Kingdom
Racehorses trained in the United Kingdom
Thoroughbred family 12-a